This is a list of African-American newspapers that have been published in Florida.  It includes both current and historical newspapers.  

The earliest known African-American journalists in Florida were John T. Shuften and John Wallace, who both worked for newspapers that were otherwise white.  The first newspaper by and for African Americans in Florida was The New Era, which Josiah T. Walls purchased in 1873.

Newspapers

See also 

List of African-American newspapers and media outlets
List of African-American newspapers in Alabama
List of African-American newspapers in Georgia
List of newspapers in Florida

Works cited

References 

Newspapers
Florida
African-American
African-American newspapers